Thomas William MacLeod (born January 10, 1951) is a former American football linebacker in the National Football League (NFL).  He was drafted by the Green Bay Packers in the 1973 NFL Draft.  He played college football at Minnesota.

A starter as a rookie in his only campaign with the Packers, MacLeod was acquired along with a 1975 eighth-round selection (192nd overall–Northwestern State running back Mario Cage) by the Baltimore Colts for Ted Hendricks and a 1975 second-round pick (28th overall–traded to Los Angeles Rams for John Hadl) on August 13, 1974. He continued to be a starter in each of the four seasons he spent in Baltimore until his retirement as an active player on July 20, 1978.

References

1951 births
Living people
People from Proctor, Minnesota
Players of American football from Minnesota
American football linebackers
Minnesota Golden Gophers football players
Green Bay Packers players
Baltimore Colts players